William "Bud" Brooks was an American football player for the Arkansas Razorbacks and the winner of the 1954 Outland Trophy as the year's best interior lineman.

Brooks played guard and defensive tackle for the Razorbacks and was selected first-team All-American following the 1954 college season by the Associated Press, the American Football Coaches Association, the Football Writers Association of America and the Walter Camp Foundation.

Brooks was selected most valuable player for the South team in the 1955 Senior Bowl. He was drafted by the Detroit Lions in the fifth round of the 1955 NFL Draft and played in one regular season game for the Lions in 1955.

See also
 1954 College Football All-America Team

References

All-American college football players
Arkansas Razorbacks football players
1930 births
2005 deaths
American football guards
Players of American football from Arkansas
Detroit Lions players
People from Cross County, Arkansas